Jimmy is a male given name of Hebrew origin. It is a diminutive form of the given name James, along with its short form, Jim. Both can also be used as the adaptation into English of the popular modern Greek name Dimitris (Δημήτρης) or the older Dimitrios (Demetrius), especially amongst Greek immigrants in English-speaking countries, due the similarity in the sound of the nickname Ντίμης/Dimi and Jimmy.

People
Jimmy Alapag (born 1977), Filipino basketball player
Jimmy Buffett (born 1946), American musician
Jimmy Butler (born 1989), American basketball player
Jimmy Barnes (born 1956), Scottish-Australian rock musician
Jimmy Bartel (born 1983), Australian rules football player
Jimmy Carr (born 1972), English stand-up comedian
Jimmy Carter (born 1924), 39th president of the United States
Jimmy Chamberlin (born 1964), American drummer 
Jimmy Chua Hwa Soon (1971–1998), Singaporean murderer
Jimmy Chin (born 1973), American professional climber and film director
Jimmy Connors (born 1952), American tennis player
Jimmy Donaldson (born 1998), American YouTuber and philanthropist, commonly known by his online alias as MrBeast
Jimmy Dean (1928–2010), American country music singer
Jimmy Doolittle (1896–1993), American General and aviation pioneer
Jimmy Dore (born 1965), American comedian
Jimmy Durante (1893–1980), American actor and comedian
Jimmy Enabu (born 1988), Ugandan basketball player
Jimmy Fallon (born 1974), American comedian
Jimmy Garoppolo (born 1991), American football quarterback
Jimmy Governor (1875–1901), Indigenous Australian outlaw
Jimmy Greaves (1940–2021), English footballer
 Jimmy Hall (born 1994), American basketball player in the Israeli National League
Jimmy Hallinan (1849–1879), Irish-American baseball player
Jimmy Hampson (1906–1938), English professional footballer
Jimmy Herget (born 1993), American baseball player
Jimmy Hoffa (1913–1982), American labor union leader
Jimmy Johnson (disambiguation), several people
Jimmy Kimmel (born 1967), American television host
Jimmy Lai (born 1948), Hong Kong entrepreneur and social activist
Jimmy Lambert (born 1994), American baseball player
Jimmy Monaghan, Irish musician
Jimmy Morales (born 1969), President of Guatemala
Jimmy Moreland (born 1996), American football player
Jimmy Murray (offensive lineman) (born 1995), American football player
Jimmy Nelson (disambiguation), several people
Jimmy Page (born 1944), English musician
Jimmy Pahun (born 1962), French politician
Jimmy Ray (born 1970), English singer
Jimmy Santos (singer), Afro-Uruguayan singer
Jimmy Santos (actor) (born 1951), Filipino comedian and former basketball player
Jimmy Savile (1926–2011), British DJ, television and radio personality, and alleged sex offender
Jimmy Smits (born 1955), American actor
Jimmy the Greek (1918–1996), American sports commentator and bookmaker
Jimmy Wakely (1914–1982), American country singer, actor
Jimmy Wong (born 1987), American musician
Jimmy Wales (born 1966), American-British entrepreneur, co-founder of Wikipedia
Jimmy Work (1924–2018), American singer-songwriter
Jimmy Yacabonis (born 1992), American baseball player
Jimmy Young, several people
Jimmy Zoppi, stage name of American voice actor James Carter Cathcart

Fictional characters
Jimmy, a character in the 2005 film version of King Kong
Jimmy the Idiot Boy, a character created by John Kricfalusi
Jimmy Crystal, a character from the animated film Sing 2
Jimmy Falcone, a character from Fugget About It
Jimmy Five, a character in the Brazilian comic series Monica's Gang
James "Jimmy" Hopkins, a character from Bully
Jimmy Hudson, a character in Marvel Comics' Ultimate Marvel universe
James "Jimmy" De Santa, a character from Grand Theft Auto V
Jimmy Lee, a character in the 1990s animated series Double Dragon
James "Jimmy" McGill, (aka Saul Goodman) a major character in Breaking Bad and the lead character in its spin-off Better Call Saul
Jimmy, a character from Ed, Edd n Eddy
Jimmy Neutron, a character from Nickelodeon's The Adventures of Jimmy Neutron: Boy Genius
Jimmy Kudo, a character in the anime Case Closed
Jimmy Olsen, a character who appears mainly in DC Comics’ Superman stories
Jimmy the raven, a raven who appeared in over 1000 films
Jimmy Two-Shoes, a character in the Canadian animated series of the same name
Jimmy Valmer, a character from South Park
Jimmy Bones, character and main antagonist from the 2001 horror film Bones
James Sadler, aka Jimmy aka Merlin, from comic fantasy book Magic 2.0 by Scott Meyer (author)
St. Jimmy, a character from the rock opera American Idiot
Jimmy Thang, aka Jimmy T., a character from the WarioWare series of video games
Jimmy the Werewolf, a character in the webcomic Fangs by Sarah Andersen
Jimmy the Robot, a character in The Aquabats! Super Show!
Jimmy Gourd, a character in the Christian computer-animated direct-to-video series VeggieTales
Jimmy Osgood, a character in Static Shock
The Jimmy, a character who has a habit of referring to himself in the third person on the 105th episode of Seinfeld.Seinfeld

See also
Jimmy (disambiguation)

English-language masculine given names
English masculine given names